Adrien Oléon (born 13 March 1989 in Clermont-Ferrand, France) is a French rugby union player. He plays at Prop for  Stade Français in the Top 14.

References

External links
Ligue Nationale De Rugby Profile
European Professional Club Rugby Profile
Stade Français Profile

1989 births
French rugby union players
Living people
Sportspeople from Clermont-Ferrand
Rugby union props